Ynys Tachwedd is a hamlet in the  community of Borth, Ceredigion, Wales, which is 80.5 miles (129.6 km) from Cardiff and 180.5 miles (290.5 km) from London. Ynys Tachwedd is represented in the Senedd by Elin Jones (Plaid Cymru) and is part of the Ceredigion constituency in the House of Commons.

Etymology
The name derives from the Welsh language: "November's island".

References

See also
List of localities in Wales by population 

Villages in Ceredigion